Eusa Kills is the second studio album by The Dead C, released in 1989 by Flying Nun Records.

Track listing

Personnel 
Adapted from Eusa Kills liner notes.
The Dead C
 Michael Morley – guitar, vocals
 Bruce Russell – guitar, vocals
 Robbie Yeats – drums

Release history

References

External links 
 

1989 albums
The Dead C albums